Herman Kahn (August 13, 1907 – June 5, 1975) was an American archivist, and served as an Assistant Archivist of the United States between 1962 and 1968.

Kahn was born in Rochester, New York, and studied history at the University of Minnesota. He received his bachelor's degree from the university in 1928 and a master's degree in 1931. After graduating he worked briefly as a history professor and historian to the National Park Service.

In 1936 Kahn joined the staff of the newly formed National Archives, with responsibility for the archives of the Interior Department. He later worked as director of the Franklin D. Roosevelt Presidential Library from 1948 to 1961. In 1968 he left governmental service to lead the archives and manuscripts program at the Yale University Library, where he remained until his death in 1975.

He was also an active contributor to the archival profession, and served in the Society of American Archivists as a member of council (1959-1963) and as president (1969-1970).

References

External links
 Herman Kahn Papers (MS 1742). Manuscripts and Archives, Yale University Library.

1907 births
1975 deaths
University of Minnesota College of Liberal Arts alumni
American archivists
Yale University people
Presidents of the Society of American Archivists